Enter the Realm of Death is the second album by Runemagick. It was released in Century Media in 1999.

Track listing
  "Hymn of Darkness (Intro)"   – 0:58  
  "Enter the Realm Of Death"   – 6:09  
  "Longing for Hades"   – 5:01  
  "Dwellers beyond Obscurity"   – 5:08  
  "Abyss of Desolation"   – 5:20  
  "Beyond (The Horizons End...)"   – 6:33  
  "Dethrone the Flesh"   – 4:33  
  "The Portal of Doom"   – 1:31  
  "Dreamvoid Serpent"   – 3:56  
  "The Call of Tombs"   – 5:53  
  "Lightworld Damnation"   – 4:08  
  "Dark Necroshadows"   – 4:53
 "The Malicious Paradise" * (cover of Tiamat)
*Not on all versions

Credits
 Nicklas "Terror" Rudolfsson - vocals, guitar, drums, keyboards, bass
 Fredrik Johnsson - bass, acoustic guitars

Runemagick albums
1999 albums